Yousry or Yousri is an Arabic given name and surname.

Notable people with this name include:

Given name

Yousri
Yousri Belgaroui, Dutch- Tunisian kickboxer

Yousry
Yousry Saber Hussein El-Gamal, Egyptian politician and government minister
Yousry Nasrallah (born 1952), Egyptian film director
Yousry Zagloul (born 1954), Egyptian judoka

Surname

Yousri
 Madiha Yousri, Egyptian actress
 Nahed Yousri, Egyptian actress

Yousry
 Amina Yousry, Egyptian squash player
 Mohamed Yousry, Egyptian interpreter

Middle name

Yousri
 Mohamed Yousri Salama (1974–2013), Egyptian politician

See also
Yousra, feminine of Yousri / Yousry